The Montgomery Building, listed on the National Register of Historic Places, is an iconic building located on Church Street in Spartanburg, Spartanburg County, South Carolina. It was built in 1924, and is a ten-story, nine-bay-wide, steel frame skyscraper faced in precast concrete. It originally housed the offices of textile companies, cotton brokers, and factories. The building also contained a theatre/auditorium space, a radio and television station. The Montgomery Building was the tallest building in Spartanburg until the 1950s. In 2016, a developer announced a $29 million plan to renovate the building for mixed-use to include apartments, offices and retail. Restoration began in Spring 2017 and was completed in December 2018.

History

For almost a century, the Montgomery Building has been a historic structure in Spartanburg. When it was built, Spartanburg County had become one of the two largest counties in the state. By the early 1920s, textiles and railroads had made Spartanburg the Hub City, a prosperous and forward-looking community in the Carolina Piedmont. The city's business leadership recognized that the area's increasing number of professionals and businessmen needed more good quality office space. The building took its name from the Montgomery family, one of the leading families of textile entrepreneurs in the area. It was built on the site of Captain John Montgomery's home, which reflects that up to that point, North Church Street between downtown and the Wofford College campus was largely a residential area. Montgomery had founded the Spartan Mill on the north side of Spartanburg, and three of his sons wound up in different branches of the family textile business.

The new 10-story building sat at the northern edge of the city's business district, on its main north-south street, Church Street. It was only a few blocks from Morgan Square, then as now the city's principal public gathering space. Most of the city's shops and business were only a few minutes’ walk from the building. In the mid-1920s, before widespread access to cars, Spartanburg was a walking city, with most of the city's 25,000 residents living within a mile or so of the central business district. When it opened in 1924, the Montgomery Building was the tallest building in the city, eclipsing the Andrews Building on Morgan Square by two stories. It held the title of tallest building until the early 1950s, and was the city's tallest commercial building until the late 1980s. (The two taller buildings were apartment buildings.)

One of the building's first significant tenants was Lockwood Greene, the engineering company that built many of the area's textile mills. They were so involved with the Piedmont's textile growth that they finally moved their offices to Spartanburg. Perhaps it is no coincidence that Lockwood Greene had designed the Montgomery Building. A number of local textile companies moved their offices into the new building, including the Pacolet Manufacturing Company, which was one of the Montgomery family's companies. Local textile powerhouses Inman Mills, Arcadia Mills, and the Deering-Milliken Mills all occupied space at some point in the Montgomery Building, as did the South Carolina Cotton Manufacturers Association.

The Montgomery Building was home to more than just mill engineers and mill management. In 1926, shortly after it opened, its tenants included several physicians, several attorneys, several real estate agents, and a number of life insurance companies. Other businesses included a cotton broker, the local offices of the Clinchfield Railroad, and the local offices of a coal mining and sales company. Spartanburg's Chamber of Commerce, the Community Chest, and the county tuberculosis association also had offices in the building. On the ground floor, a ladies’ clothing and hat store, a post office, and the theater were among the tenants. After 1930, South Carolina's first AM radio station, WSPA, operated out of the Montgomery Building.

In the 1950s, the building was alive with activity. Some of the tenants included the Ward and Covington Travel Agency, several real estate companies, several life insurance companies, several attorneys, the Harwood Beebe Civil Engineering firm, and some physicians and dentists. Future governor Donald Russell had his law office on the 8th floor. The Spartanburg County Foundation also occupied space on the 4th floor. The ground floor housed a pharmacy, a flower shop, a barber shop, and a beauty salon, among other shops. Several government offices had space in the building. The US Department of Agriculture took up large parts of several floors, with its Soil Conservation Service and related offices. The Department of Labor had offices there, as did the South Carolina Tax Commission. Truly, this was the premier office space in the community.

Even in the mid-1960s, the building remained relatively full, with the same complement of insurance agents, physicians, dentists, and real estate agents. Many of the city's leading attorneys (one of whom was the mayor in that decade) had their offices in the building, drawn no doubt to the proximity of the Spartanburg County and federal courthouses. Most of the federal government offices were gone, though Governor Donald Russell still had a law office there. Lockwood Greene had taken over the entire 10th floor, and the ground floor still had a collection of barber and beauty shops, a pharmacy, and a branch of the post office. A local labor union also had an office there, as did the local offices of the Clinchfield Railroad and Atlantic Coast Line Railroad.

In the decades after World War II, the city of Spartanburg continued to grow, and the community's prosperity led the city's boundaries to expand. In the years before World War II, Spartanburg had been a compact, walkable city. But the city's expansion, along with greater ownership of cars, led many Spartans to move further away from downtown. New neighborhoods on the city's east and west sides drew young families, and new shopping centers pulled attention away from the historic downtown. The neighborhoods close to downtown entered a period of steady decline. By the 1970s, the city saw a growing number of vacant buildings and storefronts around downtown. In a well-meaning but ultimately wrong decision, the city decided to brick over two blocks of Main Street, turning it into a pedestrianized Main Street Mall. That move took a struggling downtown and ended its reign as the city's premier shopping and office district.

The Montgomery Building suffered to some extent along with downtown. The building's Carolina Theater, which took up much of the lower floors, closed. By 1980, the building still had a few loyal tenants. A sandwich shop, barbershop, and a few random offices occupied the ground floor, along with WFBC TV Channel 4, the Greenville NBC affiliate, which had moved its Spartanburg office into the building. Several attorneys had stayed, no doubt because access to the courthouse outweighed any desire to have newer offices. Southern Bell had taken over the top two floors, and Lockwood Greene continued to have offices on the 6th floor and in various other parts of the building. A few other professionals continued to work there. But by 1992, much of the building was vacant, with offices clustered on the first, fourth, and fifth floors. Channel 4 remained on the ground floor, and The Paper, a local weekly newspaper, had offices on the 5th floor. As late as the early 2000s, the Palmetto Conservation Foundation and the Hub City Writers Project had space in the building.

Throughout its storied history, the Montgomery has stood at the crossroads not only of two major highways – both carrying US highway designation – but metaphorically, of downtown. Just blocks from Morgan Square, it continues to sit on a prominent corner within walking distance of the city's cultural center, the regional state university's business school, a new co-op grocery store, the 9-story downtown Marriott, and the courthouse. The neighborhoods near downtown have experienced their own revitalization, and downtown has seen tens of millions of dollars in investment in the past decade. Built during the early 1920s, a boom decade in Spartanburg's history, The Montgomery Building stands poised to take advantage of and contribute to a new boom decade in the early 21st century.

The Montgomery Building, which remains the third tallest downtown, is still an iconic structure, reminding residents of and visitors to the city of its past successes, recent challenges, and future possibilities.

Carolina Theatre
The theatre built alongside the office building was originally called the Montgomery Theatre. Including floor seating and two balconies, the theatre seated a total of 1300 patrons. It was the largest theatre in Spartanburg, and hosted a variety of touring musicals, plays, and vaudeville acts. In 1932, the Wilby-Kincey Company took over management and renamed it the Carolina Theatre, installing a dazzling exterior marquee. In addition to stage shows, the Carolina began showing motion pictures and became the city's premier first-run movie theater. In 1956, though now primarily a movie theater, the Carolina hosted a live performance by Elvis Presley. Over the years, the Carolina underwent a series of renovations to "modernize" the interior for moviegoers. A 1970 renovation in particular removed or covered most of the theatre's original architectural details and flourishes. Soon after, the Carolina closed, as audiences now preferred to patronize suburban cinemas and multiplexes.

Renovation

In 2016, Charleston SC based developers James Bakker and Tom Finnegan(BF Spartanburg LLC) revealed its $29 million plan to renovate the historic building, which it purchased in February 2017 from Florida-based Cypress Lending Group for $680,000.

The plan for this mixed-use project included retail and restaurant space on the ground floor, office space on the second and third floors, and 63 apartment units on the upper seven floors. Residential amenities including a fitness center and storage units were planned the basement, as well as additional office space.

It was a unique renovation project in that the building's thousands of precast concrete exterior panels were replaced with replicated panels made of modern materials and fit to historic standards. The original facade panels were cast using an inferior concrete mix and flawed techniques which, over time, caused the panels to buckle and deteriorate. Molds were made from the original panels, sharpened by an artist to capture all the details, and new panels were created as exact replicas (to historic standards) using the molds.

The developer began renovations on the 10-story building in early 2017 and completed the project in December 2018.

The Carolina Theatre was not part of the renovation project completed in 2018. However, the same developers plan to manage a restoration of the theatre in the coming years.  Input from the local community will be sought to determine the end use for the theatre.

The Montgomery Building was listed on the National Register of Historic Places in 2011.

Awards and recognition
The Montgomery Building's renovation has been recognized with numerous awards, including the 2020 Gignilliat Preservation Award from the Spartanburg County Historical Association; the 2021 Palladio Award for Commercial Adaptive Reuse and/or Sympathetic Addition from Traditional Building Magazine; and the 2021 Preservation Honor Award from Preservation South Carolina, SCDAH, and the Office of the Governor.

References

External links

 The Montgomery Building website

Office buildings on the National Register of Historic Places in South Carolina
Buildings and structures completed in 1924
Buildings and structures in Spartanburg, South Carolina
National Register of Historic Places in Spartanburg, South Carolina
Skyscrapers in South Carolina
Skyscraper office buildings in South Carolina
1924 establishments in South Carolina
Chicago school architecture in the United States